The 1949 Polish Speedway season was the 1949 season of motorcycle speedway in Poland.

Individual

Polish Individual Speedway Championship
The 1949 Individual Speedway Polish Championship was held in Leszno on 23 October 1949. It was the fifth running of the Championship.

Result

E – retired or mechanical failure •
F – fell •
N – non-starter

Team Speedway Polish Championship
The 1949 Team Speedway Polish Championship was the second edition of the Team Polish Championship.

In First and Second League, matches were played with part three teams. Teams were made up of 3 riders plus 1 reserve.  The event consisted of  9 races.  In one day were played three three-cornered matches.  For winning a match a team received 3 points, for second place 2 points, and for third 1 point.  In every heat scoring was 3–2–1 and 0 if no-completion heat. The drivers with the main squad of a team started in a match 3 times. The quantity of small points was added up.

First League 

Any team was relegated to lower division.

 Medalists

Second League 

Event between Rawicz, Łódź and Poznań was cancelled and never replayed.

References

Poland Individual
Poland Team
Speedway